Raphael Schwendinger (born 1 January 1998) is a Liechtensteiner judoka.

In May 2021, he spent several weeks training with the Russian judo team and sparred with multiple world and European champion Alexander Mikhaylin. He was selected to compete at the 2020 Summer Games and drawn against Colton Brown in the first round.

References

1998 births
Living people
Liechtenstein male judoka
Olympic judoka of Liechtenstein
Judoka at the 2020 Summer Olympics
European Games competitors for Liechtenstein
Judoka at the 2019 European Games